Doug Erholtz is an American voice actor. He is best known for his performances as Inspector Zenigata from Lupin the Third, Kisuke Urahara, Gin Ichimaru, and Rudbornn Chelute briefly from Bleach, TK Takaishi from Digimon Adventure 02, Squall Leonhart from the Final Fantasy series and the Kingdom Hearts series, Asuma Sarutobi and Kankuro from Naruto, Jean Pierre Polnareff from JoJo's Bizarre Adventure: Stardust Crusaders and JoJo's Bizarre Adventure: Golden Wind, and Hamrio Musica from Rave Master.

Roles

Anime

 Battle B-Daman – Joe, Biarce
 BlazBlue Alter Memory – Hazama, Yuuki Terumi
 Bleach – Kisuke Urahara (Eps. 231-366), Gin Ichimaru, Rudbornn Chelute (Ep. 157)
 Blue Exorcist – Kaoru Tsubaki
 Bobobo-bo Bo-bobo – Nightmare
 Buso Renkin – Shinobu Negoro
 Code Geass: Lelouch of the Rebellion – Yoshida
 Demon Slayer: Kimetsu no Yaiba - Kasugai Crow
 Devilman Crybaby - Koji Nagasaki
 Digimon Adventure – MetalSeadramon, SkullGreymon, Susumu Kamiya, Jim Kido, Deramon, Unimon, Chuumon
 Digimon Adventure 02 – T.K. Takaishi, BigMamemon, SkullGreymon, Jim Kido, Mr. Motomiya
 Digimon Fusion – SkullMeramon (Ep. 7-9), Garbagemon, Hagurumon, Tyutyumon, Golemon, Bulbmon
 Dinozaurs – Taki
 Dorohedoro – Chōta
 Dragon Ball Super (Toonami Asia) – Whis
 Drifting Dragons – Berko
 Duel Masters – Hakuoh (Season 2 and 3)
 Durarara!! series – Ran Izumii (Season 1), Max Sandshelt
 Fate/stay night – Shinji Matou
 Fate/Zero – Kayneth El-Melloi Archibald
 Fighting Spirit - Takeshi Sendo
 Flint the Time Detective – Merlock Holmes, Lucas (Ep. 3), Bubblegum, Young Auguste Rodin (Ep. 9)
 Gankutsuou: The Count of Monte Cristo – Lucien Debray
 Great Teacher Onizuka – Suguru Teshigawara
 Grenadier – Teppa Aizen
 Gurren Lagann – Iraak Coega
 IGPX – Zanak Strauss
 I Luv Halloween – Finch 
 JoJo's Bizarre Adventure: Stardust Crusaders – Jean Pierre Polnareff
 JoJo's Bizarre Adventure: Golden Wind – Jean Pierre Polnareff
 Kashimashi: Girl Meets Girl – Asuta Soro
 Deer Squad – Sir Steel
 Kyou Kara Maou! – Conrad Weller
 Lupin the Third Part IV: The Italian Adventure – Inspector Zenigata
 Lupin the Third Part V – Inspector Zenigata
 Magi: The Labyrinth of Magic – Zagan
 MÄR – Leno, Ian
 March Comes In like a Lion – Issa Matsumoto
 Mazinkaiser SKL – Ryo Magami
 Mobile Suit Gundam: Iron-Blooded Orphans – Akihiro Altland
 Mobile Suit Gundam: The Origin – Ortega
 Monster – Otto Heckel, Hebert Knaup
 Nodame Cantabile – Shinchi Chiaki
 Naruto – Asuma Sarutobi, Kagari
 Naruto: Shippuden – Asuma Sarutobi, Kankuro (Five Kage Summit Arc +), Katazu (Ep. 181)
 Nura: Rise of the Yokai Clan – Kuromaru, Kyuso
 Patlabor – Asuma Shinohara (Bandai Visual USA dub)
 Rave Master – Hamrio Musica
 Saiyuki Reload – God
 Samurai Champloo – Umanosuke (Eps. 24-26)
 Scrapped Princess – Kidaf Gillot the Silencer
 SD Gundam Force – Captain Gundam, Grappler Gouf
 Sword Art Online – Kuradeel (Eps. 8, 10)
 The Prince of Tennis – Takeshi Momoshiro, Kippei Tachibana
 The Seven Deadly Sins – Slader
 Ultra Maniac – Jun Kawanakajima, Shinnouske, The Prince
 Yashahime: Princess Half-Demon – Venom Serpent
 Zegapain – Chris Avenir

Western animation
 The Avenging Apes of Africa – Libya
Care Bears: Welcome to Care-a-Lot – Grumpy Bear, Champ Bear, Beastly
 El Chavo – Quico, Mr. Raymond
 Enchantimals: Tales from Everwilde – Sprint, Flap
 The Grossery Gang – Faked Beanz, Bad Beef Can, Sloppy Soup Tin, Mop Head, Feather Duster
The Snow Queen – Orm

Anime films

 Berserk: Golden Age Arc – Corkus
 Bleach: Fade to Black – Kisuke Urahara
 Digimon: The Movie – T.K. Takaishi
 Digimon Adventure 02: Revenge of Diaboromon – T.K. Takaishi
 Digimon Adventure tri. – Daigo Nishijima, Koromon
 Digimon Frontier: Island of Lost Digimon – Dinohyumon
 Expelled from Paradise – Alonzo Percy
 Fate/stay night: Unlimited Blade Works – Shinji Matou
 Gantz:O – Hachiro Oka
 Kite Liberator – Koichi Doi
 Kingsglaive: Final Fantasy XV – Castle Guards
 Lu over the Wall – Esojima
 Lupin the Third: Blood Seal of the Eternal Mermaid – Inspector Zenigata
 Lupin the Third: Legend of the Gold of Babylon – Inspector Zenigata
 Lupin the Third: Goodbye Partner – Inspector Zenigata
 Lupin III: The First – Inspector Zenigata, Additional Voices
 Naruto Shippuden the Movie: The Will of Fire – Asuma Sarutobi, Kankuro
 Naruto Shippuden the Movie: The Lost Tower – Young Asuma Sarutobi
 Patlabor: The Movie – Asuma Shinohara
 Patlabor 2: The Movie – Asuma Shinohara
 Paprika – Doctor Morio Osanai
 Redline – Titan
 Team Hot Wheels: Build the Epic Race – Greasebeard

Film
 Happily N'Ever After 2 – McDowner, Pied Piper, Simple Simon
 The Flintstones & WWE: Stone Age SmackDown! – Additional voices

Video games

 .hack//G.U. vol.2//Reminisce – Hiiragi
 .hack//G.U. vol.3//Redemption – Hiiragi
 .hack//INFECTION – Balmung
 Binary Domain – Additional voices
 Bleach – Gin Ichimaru, Kisuke Urahara
 BlazBlue series – Hazama, Yuuki Terumi (BlazBlue: Continuum Shift Extend onward, replacing Erik Davies)
 Catherine: Full Body – Justin Bailey
 Chocobo GP – Squall Leonhart
 Demon Slayer: Kimetsu no Yaiba – The Hinokami Chronicles – Kasugai Crows, Akaza
 Digimon Rumble Arena – T.K.
 Dissidia Final Fantasy – Squall Leonhart
 Dissidia 012 Final Fantasy – Squall Leonhart
 Dissidia Final Fantasy NT – Squall Leonhart 
 Final Fantasy: Explorers – Squall Leonhart
 Fire Emblem: Three Houses – Acheron
 Fire Emblem Warriors: Three Hopes – Acheron
 Kingdom Hearts II – Squall Leonhart
 Kingdom Hearts III Re:Mind – Squall Leonhart
 Mobius Final Fantasy – Squall Leonhart Naruto series – Asuma Sarutobi, Kankuro
 Detective Pikachu – Pablo Millan
 Rave Master – Hedara Musica
 Rogue Galaxy – Young Dorgengoa
 Sengoku Basara: Samurai Heroes – Additional voices (warriors)
 Seven Knights – Spike 
 Seven Samurai 20XX – Tatsuma
 Shenmue III – Additional Cast
 Star Ocean: Second Evolution – Bowman Jeane
 Street Fighter series – Vega
 World of Final Fantasy – Squall Leonhart
 Xenoblade Chronicles X – Frye
 Xenosaga Episode III: Also sprach Zarathustra – U-DO

Other
 Adventures in Voice Acting Violetta'' – Pablo Galindo (English dub)

References

External links

Doug Erholtz at the CrystalAcids Anime Voice Actor Database
Doug La Rosa at the CrystalAcids Anime Voice Actor Database

Living people
American male video game actors
American male voice actors
Place of birth missing (living people)
21st-century American male actors
Year of birth missing (living people)